William Salmon (June 2, 1802 – February 8, 1868) was an English-born lawyer, judge and political figure in Upper Canada. He represented Norfolk in the Legislative Assembly of Upper Canada from 1838 to 1841 as a Conservative.

He was born in Alveston, the son of Colonel George Salmon, and came to Upper Canada with his parents in 1809. Salmon studied law with John Rolph and practised for a time in London before settling in Simcoe. He was married twice: first to Emma, a sister of John Rolph, and then to a daughter of a James Fraser. He served as a major in the Norfolk militia. Salmon was elected to the assembly in an 1838 by-election held after John Rolph was expelled from the assembly for conspiring with the rebels during the Upper Canada Rebellion. He was named a judge in the Norfolk County Court in 1845. Salmon died in Simcoe.

References 

1802 births
1868 deaths
Members of the Legislative Assembly of Upper Canada
Judges in Ontario
Province of Canada judges
People from Alveston